The 1971 Bowling Green Falcons football team was an American football team that represented Bowling Green University in the Mid-American Conference (MAC) during the 1971 NCAA University Division football season. In their fourth season under head coach Don Nehlen, the Falcons compiled a 6–4 record (4–1 against MAC opponents) and outscored their opponents by a combined total of 263 to 207.

The team's statistical leaders included Reid Lamport with 1,006 passing yards, Paul Miles with 1,185 rushing yards, and Rick Newman with 443 receiving yards.

Schedule

References

Bowling Green
Bowling Green Falcons football seasons
Bowling Green Falcons football